Deloit is an unincorporated community in Holt County, Nebraska, United States.

History
A post office was established at Deloit in the 1870s. Deloit was likely named after Deloit, Iowa.

References

Unincorporated communities in Holt County, Nebraska
Unincorporated communities in Nebraska